Alexander Bau (born 17 April 1970) is a German luger. He competed in the men's singles event at the 1994 Winter Olympics.

References

External links
 

1970 births
Living people
German male lugers
Olympic lugers of Germany
Lugers at the 1994 Winter Olympics
People from Erzgebirgskreis
Sportspeople from Saxony
20th-century German people